The Parkersburg News and Sentinel is the primary newspaper in Parkersburg, West Virginia. It was formed by the merger of the previously separate morning News and afternoon Sentinel on April 25, 2009. Prior to the merge, the Sentinel had published continuously for 134 years.

See also
 List of newspapers in West Virginia

References

External links
News and Sentinel website

Newspapers published in West Virginia
Parkersburg, West Virginia